The 1991 Wales rugby union tour of Australia was a series of matches played in June and July 1991 in Australia by Wales national rugby union team.

Results 
Scores and results list Wales's points tally first.

References 
 

1991
1991
1991 rugby union tours
1990–91 in Welsh rugby union
1991 in Australian rugby union
History of rugby union matches between Australia and Wales